Salvador Vilanova (born 30 October 1952) is a Salvadoran former swimmer. He competed at the 1968 Summer Olympics and the 1972 Summer Olympics.

References

1952 births
Living people
Salvadoran male swimmers
Olympic swimmers of El Salvador
Swimmers at the 1968 Summer Olympics
Swimmers at the 1972 Summer Olympics
Sportspeople from San Salvador